Francis Noel Duffy (born 21 April 1971) is an Irish Green Party politician who has been a Teachta Dála (TD) for Dublin South-West since the 2020 general election.

Early life and education
Duffy was born in Kingston upon Thames, Greater London. His family moved back to Ireland where they settled in Carrickmacross, County Monaghan. He attended the Patrician High School. He then went on to study Architecture at London South Bank University and completed a Bachelor of Science at the Dublin School of Architecture (at Dublin Institute of Technology), where he has since taught.

Political career
Duffy was an unsuccessful candidate for Dublin South-West at the 2011 general election, the 2014 Dublin South-West by-election, and the 2016 general election. He was elected for Dublin South-West at the 2020 general election. He served as a member of South Dublin County Council from 2014 to 2020 for the Rathfarnham and Firhouse areas.

Personal life
Duffy is married to fellow Green Party TD Catherine Martin; they have three children.

See also
Families in the Oireachtas

References

External links
Green Party profile

1971 births
Alumni of Dublin Institute of Technology
Alumni of London South Bank University
British emigrants to Ireland
Green Party (Ireland) TDs
Irish architects
Living people
Local councillors in South Dublin (county)
Martin family (Green Party)
Members of the 33rd Dáil
People from Carrickmacross
Politicians from County Monaghan
Spouses of Irish politicians